Gordei Olegovich Gorshkov (born 11 February 1993) is a Russian former figure skater. He is the 2013 Winter Universiade silver medalist, the 2013 Ice Challenge bronze medalist, and a four-time medalist on the ISU Junior Grand Prix series.

Personal life 
Gordei Olegovich Gorshkov was born on 11 February 1993 in Saint Petersburg, Russia, the son of former competitive figure skaters. His parents, Svetlana Frantsuzova and Oleg Gorshkov, are the 1985 Winter Universiade bronze medalists in pair skating.

Career 
Gorshkov made his ISU Junior Grand Prix (JGP) debut in the 2007–08 season, finishing 8th in Bulgaria. He won a pair of bronze medals during the 2009–10 JGP series.

Gorshkov won a silver medal and placed 4th at his JGP events in 2010. He qualified for the JGP Final where he finished 8th. He won bronze at the 2011 Russian Junior Championships and was sent to the 2011 Junior Worlds, where he ranked 9th. The next season, Gorshkov took silver in his sole JGP event. He was coached by Alexei Urmanov for a number of years.

In autumn 2012, Gorshkov decided to try pair skating. He chose to return to single skating and made his senior international debut at the 2013 Ice Challenge where he won the bronze medal. He then won silver at the 2013 Winter Universiade.

Gorshkov finished 5th at the 2015 Russian Championships and 4th at the 2016 Russian Championships.

Programs

Competitive highlights 
GP: Grand Prix; CS: Challenger Series; JGP: Junior Grand Prix

Detailed results 
Small medals for short and free programs awarded only at ISU Championships.

References

External links 

 

Russian male single skaters
1993 births
Living people
Figure skaters from Saint Petersburg
Universiade medalists in figure skating
Universiade silver medalists for Russia
Competitors at the 2013 Winter Universiade
Competitors at the 2015 Winter Universiade